Edward Patrick Kelly (born 7 February 1951) is a Scottish former footballer, who played as a midfielder. Kelly featured for clubs Arsenal, Queens Park Rangers, Leicester City, Notts County, AFC Bournemouth, Kettering Town and Torquay United.

Club career
Kelly was born in Glasgow and played for local side Possil YM, an Arsenal nursery side, before moving south to join English club Arsenal as an apprentice in July 1966; he turned professional 18 months later. A regular in the reserves and for Scotland U-23 side, he made his debut for Arsenal on 6 September 1969 against Sheffield Wednesday and quickly made a name for himself. He made 16 appearances in the 1969–70 season, including scoring a goal in the Gunners' 4–3 aggregate win over Anderlecht in the Inter-Cities Fairs Cup final.

Better was to come the next season for the young central midfielder. Kelly made 34 appearances as Arsenal won the Double; he came on as a substitute in the FA Cup final against Liverpool, and scored the Gunners' equaliser in extra time in a goalmouth scramble. George Graham made a claim for the goal, but the replays show Kelly was the last Arsenal player to touch the ball. Kelly was thus the first substitute to score in an FA Cup final. Charlie George scored soon after to win the match 2–1.

Injury hampered Kelly's next two seasons at Arsenal, but he became a near-ever present in 1974–75. He was made club captain at the age of 23; only Tony Adams has captained Arsenal at a younger age. However, Kelly lost his place the following season and became quite unsettled. After making a transfer request, he joined Queens Park Rangers in September 1976, having played 222 times and scoring nine goals altogether for Arsenal.

Kelly spent only a single season at QPR before being signed for Leicester City by former Arsenal and QPR teammate Frank McLintock in the summer of 1977. He spent three seasons at Filbert Street, playing 119 times and scoring 3 goals. Leicester were relegated to the Second Division in 1978 but then returned to the top flight as champions the following year. He went on to have short spells at Notts County, AFC Bournemouth and Torquay United, before retiring.

International career
Kelly featured for Scotland's Under 19 and Under 23 teams.

Personal life
He now lives in Torquay, and works for a double glazing firm.

Honours
Arsenal
First Division: 1970–71
FA Cup: 1970–71
Inter-Cities Fairs Cup: 1969–70

Leicester City
Second Division: 1980–81

References

External links 

1951 births
AFC Bournemouth players
Arsenal F.C. players
Association football midfielders
Kettering Town F.C. players
Leicester City F.C. players
Living people
Notts County F.C. players
Queens Park Rangers F.C. players
Scottish footballers
English Football League players
Torquay United F.C. players
Scotland under-23 international footballers
Footballers from Glasgow
Saltash United F.C. players
FA Cup Final players